Rosokhach is a village situated in Chortkiv Raion (district) of Ternopil Oblast (province) in western Ukraine. It belongs to Chortkiv urban hromada, one of the hromadas of Ukraine.
 
The village has 1947 inhabitants and local government is administered by Rosokhach village council.

Geography  
The village is located at an altitude of 207 meters above sea level  on the banks of the Seret River, and covers an area of 3,263 km2.

History 
The first written mention of the village Rosokhach dates back to 1785. Near the village are the remains of a Trypillian culture settlement.  Fragments of ceramics and copper fragments were found, which are stored in the Lviv Historical Museum.

Cult constructions and religion 
In the village there are two religious communities and there are two churches: 
 St. Nicholas Church OCU (1904)
 St. Nicholas Church UGCC (1995).
Roman Catholic Church is in the village, which was built in 1936. Today is not valid.

References

External links 
 Чортківська районна рада | історична довідка | Росохач 
  Castles and Churches of Ukraine, Rosokhach 	
 weather.in.ua, Rosokhach (Ternopil region)

Villages in Chortkiv Raion